KNSP (1430 AM) is a radio station broadcasting a sports format. Licensed to Staples, Minnesota, United States, the station is owned by Hubbard Broadcasting, Inc., through licensee HBI Radio Brainerd/Wadena, LLC.

KNSP's programming is primarily supplied by the Fan Radio Network, based out of KFXN-FM in Minneapolis–St. Paul; evening and overnight programming comes from ESPN Radio. Prior to 2017, KNSP simulcast classic country from Wadena sister station KWAD for about a quarter-century.

Ownership change
Hubbard Broadcasting announced on November 13, 2014 that it would purchase the Omni Broadcasting stations, including KNSP. The sale was completed on February 27, 2015, at a purchase price of $8 million for the 16 stations and one translator.

References

External links

Sports radio stations in the United States
Radio stations in Minnesota
Hubbard Broadcasting
Radio stations established in 1982